Robert "B. J." Johnson Jr. (born December 21, 1995) is an American professional basketball player for Real Betis of the Spanish Liga ACB. He played college basketball for La Salle and Syracuse.

High school career
Johnson is the son of Robert Johnson, who played basketball at La Salle University from 1986 to 1990. B.J. grew up outside Philadelphia and attended Lower Merion High School, Kobe Bryant's alma mater. He had 22 points and 11 rebounds in a win over Chester High School in the 2013 state championship. Johnson was a top 100 high school prospect.

College career
Johnson originally committed to Syracuse out of high school. He averaged 4.1 points and 3.1 rebounds per game as a sophomore. After the season, he decided to transfer to La Salle. He explained that coach John Giannini told him he would be an impact player after sitting out the requisite year. Johnson scored 35 points in a December 2016 win over Florida Gulf Coast. As a junior at La Salle, Johnson led the team in points (17.6 per game) and rebounds (6.3) per game. He was named to the First team All-Big 5. After the season he declared for the 2017 NBA draft, but ultimately withdrew his name. As a senior, Johnson was named to the Second Team All-Atlantic 10. He was also named to the First Team All-Big 5 after a season in which he averaged 20.8 points per game, the most for an Explorer since Rasual Butler in 2002, as well as leading the team with 8.3 rebounds per game. He graduated from La Salle with a degree in finance.

Professional career

Lakeland Magic (2018–2019)
After going undrafted in the 2018 NBA draft, Johnson signed with the Charlotte Hornets for NBA Summer League competition. On September 5, 2018, Johnson signed with the Orlando Magic. He was waived by the Magic on October 10 but would play for their G League affiliate the Lakeland Magic. On October 23, 2018, Johnson was included in the training camp roster of the Lakeland Magic.

Atlanta Hawks (2019)
On March 1, 2019, Johnson signed a 10-day contract with the Atlanta Hawks. Johnson made his NBA debut two days later, putting up 11 points on perfect 4/4 shooting (3/3 three-point shooting), 2 rebounds, and a steal during 19 minutes of action in a 123–118 win over the Chicago Bulls. On March 12, Johnson signed a second 10-day contract. After the expiration of his second 10-day contract, Johnson returned to the Lakeland Magic.

Sacramento Kings (2019)
On April 2, 2019, Johnson signed a rest-of-season contract with the Sacramento Kings. On July 19, 2019, Johnson was waived by the Kings.

Orlando Magic (2019–2020)

On September 27, 2019, Johnson re-signed with the Orlando Magic for training camp, however, he was waived on October 19. On November 4, the Magic signed him to a two-way contract. On January 4, 2020, Johnson tallied 35 points, eight rebounds and two assists in the G League against the Canton Charge. He averaged 22.9 points, 6.4 rebounds and 2.1 steals per game for Lakeland. Johnson was named to the All-NBA G League Second Team.

Long Island Nets (2021)
On December 4, 2020, Johnson signed with the Miami Heat. On December 19, 2020, Johnson was waived by the Heat. He was added to the Long Island Nets roster and made his debut on February 10, 2021. In 14 games, he averaged 18.4 points, 5.6 rebounds, 1.6 assists and 1.0 steals in 31.1 minutes per game.

Brisbane Bullets (2021)
On April 19, 2021, Johnson signed with the Brisbane Bullets of the Australian National Basketball League for the remainder of the 2020–21 season. In 11 games, he averaged 10.0 points and 3.7 rebounds in 21.5 minutes per game.

Second stint with Lakeland / Orlando Magic (2021–2022)
On October 15, 2021, Johnson signed with the Orlando Magic, but was waived the next day. On October 28, he re-signed with the Lakeland Magic as an affiliate player where he played 10 games and averaged 24.7 points, 7.5 rebounds, 1.3 assists and 1.0 steals in 34.5 minutes per game.

On December 17, 2021, Johnson signed a 10-day contract with the Orlando Magic. and on January 4, 2022, he was reacquired and activated by Lakeland.

Real Betis (2022–present)
On April 6, 2022, Johnson signed with Coosur Real Betis of the Spanish Liga ACB.

Career statistics

NBA

Regular season

|-
| style="text-align:left;"|
| style="text-align:left;"|Atlanta
| 6 || 0 || 7.2 || .500 || .500 || 1.000 || 1.3 || .0 || .3 || .0 || 3.5
|-
| style="text-align:left;"|
| style="text-align:left;"|Sacramento
| 1 || 0 || 6.0 || .500 || .000 ||  || .0 || .0 || .0 || .0 || 2.0
|-
| style="text-align:left;"|
| style="text-align:left;"|Orlando
| 10 || 0 || 8.3 || .281 || .333 || .900 || 1.5 || .3 || .3 || .0 || 3.0
|-
| style="text-align:left;"|
| style="text-align:left;"|Orlando
| 4 || 0 || 16.3 || .440 || .400 ||  || 3.8 || .0 || .0 || .3 || 6.5
|- class="sortbottom"
| style="text-align:center;" colspan="2"|Career
| 21 || 0 || 9.4 || .387 || .385 || .917 || 1.8 || .1 || .2 || .0 || 3.8

Playoffs

|-
| style="text-align:left;"|2020
| style="text-align:left;"|Orlando
| 1 || 0 || 4.0 || .500 || 1.000 || – || 2.0 || .0 || .0 || .0 || 3.0

College

|-
| style="text-align:left;"|2013–14
| style="text-align:left;"|Syracuse
| 10 || 0 || 5.5 || .250 || .125 ||  || .9 || .2 || .1 || .3 || 1.4
|-
| style="text-align:left;"|2014–15
| style="text-align:left;"|Syracuse
| 25 || 4 || 14.6 || .307 || .262 || .720 || 3.2 || .5 || .6 || .2 || 4.2
|-
| style="text-align:left;"|2016–17
| style="text-align:left;"|La Salle
| 29 || 28 || 32.6 || .449 || .362 || .838 || 6.3 || 1.0 || 1.1 || .5 || 17.6
|-
| style="text-align:left;"|2017–18
| style="text-align:left;"|La Salle
| 27 || 27 || 35.2 || .446 || .359 || .869 || 8.3 || .7 || 1.3 || .7 || 20.8
|- class="sortbottom"
| style="text-align:center;" colspan="2"|Career
| 91 || 59 || 25.5 || .426 || .335 || .843 || 5.5 || .7 || .9 || 0.5 || 13.1

References

External links

 La Salle Explorers bio

1995 births
Living people
American expatriate basketball people in Australia
American men's basketball players
Atlanta Hawks players
Basketball players from Philadelphia
Brisbane Bullets players
Lakeland Magic players
La Salle Explorers men's basketball players
Long Island Nets players
Lower Merion High School alumni
Orlando Magic players
Real Betis Baloncesto players
Sacramento Kings players
Shooting guards
Sportspeople from Montgomery County, Pennsylvania
Syracuse Orange men's basketball players
Undrafted National Basketball Association players
United States men's national basketball team players